The name Boris has been used for seven tropical cyclones in the Eastern Pacific Ocean.
 Hurricane Boris (1984) – a Category 1 hurricane with no impacts on land that lasted from May 28 to June 18, a total of 21 days, one of the longest lasting hurricanes on record, and one of the longest-lived storms on record for the East Pacific
 Hurricane Boris (1990) – a Category 1 hurricane whose outer rainbands produced moderate rain in several Mexican states
 Hurricane Boris (1996) – a Category 1 hurricane that made landfall in southern Mexico causing heavy flooding that resulted in ten fatalities
 Tropical Storm Boris (2002) – a moderate tropical storm that dumped heavy rains on sections of the Mexican coast
 Hurricane Boris (2008) – a Category 1 hurricane with no impacts on land
 Tropical Storm Boris (2014) – a weak tropical storm that struck southern Mexico in early June
 Tropical Storm Boris (2020) – a weak tropical storm that moved into the Central Pacific without affecting land

Pacific hurricane set index articles